Sturdee may refer to:

Admiral of the Fleet Sir Frederick Charles Doveton Sturdee, 1st Baronet, GCB, KCMG, CVO (9 June 1859 – 7 May 1925)
Lieutenant General Sir Vernon Ashton Hobart Sturdee KBE, CB, DSO (16 April 1890 – 25 May 1966), his nephew 

Rear Admiral Arthur Rodney Barry Sturdee (1919–2009), cousin of the above